The Chinese Akkaia, (Akkaia taiwana), is an aphid in the superfamily Aphidoidea in the order Hemiptera. It is a true bug and sucks sap from plants.

References 

 http://www.catalogueoflife.org/annual-checklist/2011/search/all/key/akkaia+taiwana/match/1|titel= Species 2000 & ITIS Catalogue of Life: 2011 Annual Checklist.|hämtdatum= 24 September 2012 |författare= Bisby F.A., Roskov Y.R., Orrell T.M., Nicolson D., Paglinawan L.E., Bailly N., Kirk P.M., Bourgoin T., Baillargeon G., Ouvrard D. (red.)|datum= 2011|verk= |utgivare=Species 2000: Reading, UK.
 Eastop & Hille Ris Lambers (1976), Survey of the world's aphids, Dr. W. Junk, The Hague 573 pp
 Remaudière, G. & M. Remaudière (1997), Catalogue of the World's Aphididae, INRA, Paris 473 pp
 Qiao, Jiang & Ren (2006) A review on the genus Akkaia Takahashi (Hemiptera: Aphididae) from China, with the description of a new species, Entomological News 117(1):31-40
 Carver (1976) New and recent additions to the aphid fauna of Australia (Homoptera: Aphididae), Journal of the Australian Entomological Society 15:461-465
 AphidSF: Aphid Species File. Favret C., 2010-04-14
 Tseng & Tao (1938) New and unrecorded aphids of China, Journal of the West China Border Research Society 10:195-224

Macrosiphini
Agricultural pest insects